Romain Pillon (born 22 September 1988 in Croix, Nord) is a French former professional cyclist. His father, Laurent Pillon, was also a professional cyclist.

Major results
2012
2nd Tour du Piémont Vosgien

References

External links

1988 births
Living people
French male cyclists
People from Croix, Nord
Sportspeople from Nord (French department)
Cyclists from Hauts-de-France
21st-century French people